Jason Michael Goldberg, professionally known as Cheese, is an American record producer, songwriter, and audio engineer. He's known widely for his production on YoungBoy Never Broke Again's Sincerely, Kentrell, The Last Slimeto, and the Birdman-assisted, From the Bayou. He also acted as an engineer on Travis Scott and Kendrick Lamar's hit song, "goosebumps" and Tyler, the Creator, Ty Dolla $ign, and YoungBoy Never Broke Again's "WusYaName".

Early life 
Jason Goldberg is American. He had "fell in love with music as a teenager". Goldberg had later begun to study at the Institute of Audio Research and Full Sail University; while studying, Goldberg found his way into audio recording.

Career 
Cheese has worked with the artist and producers YoungBoy Never Broke Again, Travis Scott, Lil Wayne, Rich The Kid, Kendrick Lamar, Pop Smoke, Tyler, the Creator, Buddah Bless and 30 Roc. 

On September 3, 2016, Goldberg acted as an assistant engineer for Travis Scott and Kendrick Lamar’s song "goosebumps" which peaked at number 32 on the Billboard Hot 100 and went eight times platinum by the Recording Industry Association of America (RIAA). He's also received over twenty plaques producing for YoungBoy Never Broke Again, however, the most notable plaque he has received is for his production on YoungBoy's "Kacey Talk" which was certified 2x platinum.

Production credits

Singles
2020
 "Kacey Talk" (YoungBoy Never Broke Again) 
 "Callin" (YoungBoy Never Broke Again featuring Snoop Dogg) 

2021
 "Toxic Punk" (YoungBoy Never Broke Again) 
 "Territorial"  (YoungBoy Never Broke Again) 
 "Twin" (GoldLink featuring Rich the Kid) 
 "Lost Souls"  (Rojay MLP) 
 "Life Support" (YoungBoy Never Broke Again) 
 "On My Side" (YoungBoy Never Broke Again) 
 "Unwanted Lifestyle" (NoCap) 
 "Blood Sweat Tears" (Bay Swag) 

2022
 "Bring the Hook" (YoungBoy Never Broke Again) 
 "Hit" (YoungBoy Never Broke Again & DaBaby) 
 "SuperBowl" (YoungBoy Never Broke Again) 
 "I Hate YoungBoy" (YoungBoy Never Broke Again) 
 "Neighborhood Superstar" (YoungBoy Never Broke Again & DaBaby) 
 "Don't Rate Me" (YoungBoy Never Broke Again) 
 "Proud of Myself" (YoungBoy Never Broke Again) 
 "Goals" (YoungBoy Never Broke Again) 
 "Vette Motors" (YoungBoy Never Broke Again) 
 "Late To Da Party (F*CK BET)" (YoungBoy Never Broke Again & Lil Nas X) 
 "Keep Me Dry" (YoungBoy Never Broke Again & Quando Rondo)

Albums

Engineering credits

References

External links

 

Living people
Year of birth missing (living people)
American hip hop record producers
American writers